Little Ocmulgee State Park & Lodge is a  Georgia state park located  north of McRae-Helena on the Little Ocmulgee River. Part of the park was initially built by the Civilian Conservation Corps during the Great Depression, around the natural diversion of the Little Ocmulgee into a lake. This is a  lake with beach, and the park includes a 60 room lodge and a championship 18-hole golf course with pro shop, known as the Wallace Adams Memorial Golf Course. The soil around the Ocmulgee River and the Little Ocmulgee is a fine white sand, and therefore the lake has its own "beach sand".

Facilities

60 lodge rooms
55 tent/trailer/RV sites
10 cottages
7 picnic shelters
1 group shelter
Nature trail
Group camp
Pioneer camping
18 hole golf course and pro shop
Amphitheater
Restaurant

References

External links

Little Ocmulgee State Park

State parks of Georgia (U.S. state)
Protected areas of Wheeler County, Georgia